Orono High School is a high school in Orono, Maine, United States. Founded in 1915, it is the only high school in Regional School Unit 26.

History
The first class graduated from Orono in 1885, and a new school building was opened in the first years of the 20th century.

Athletics
Orono's athletic teams are nicknamed Red Riots. The football team competes in the North Little Ten Conference.

*denotes championship was a co-championship**denotes championship was part of a co-op team with Old Town High School

Performing arts
OHS has a competitive show choir. It won the Maine state championship in 2019.

Notable alumni
Steve Abbott, politician
Anne Hall, US ambassador to Lithuania
Ann O'Leary, political advisor

References

Public high schools in Maine
Schools in Penobscot County, Maine
Orono, Maine